Seorin-dong is a dong, neighbourhood of Jongno-gu in Seoul, South Korea. It is a legal dong (법정동 ) administered under its administrative dong (행정동 ), Jongno 1, 2, 3, 4 ga-dong.

Attraction
 Art Center Nabi
 Korea Kumho Pertrochemical Co., Ltd

See also 
Administrative divisions of South Korea

References

External links
 Jongno-gu Official site in English
 Jongno-gu Official site
 Status quo of Jongno-gu by administrative dong 
 Resident office info and map of Jongno-gu
 Origin of Seorin-dong's name

Neighbourhoods of Jongno-gu